The Brandenburg Arch is a 1929 German silent drama film directed by Max Knaake and William Dieterle and starring Paul Henckels, June Marlowe and Aribert Mog. It was made by the German branch of Universal Pictures.

The film's sets were designed by the art directors Max Knaake and Fritz Maurischat.

Cast

References

Bibliography

External links

1929 films
Films of the Weimar Republic
Films directed by William Dieterle
German silent feature films
German black-and-white films
Universal Pictures films
German drama films
1929 drama films
Silent drama films
1920s German films
1920s German-language films